The Roewe 750 is an executive saloon that was produced by Roewe in China between 2006 and 2016, based on the Rover 75.

Overview
Launched in October 2006, and codenamed SAC528 during development, the wheelbase of the Roewe 750 is stretched by  compared to the Rover 75. The drivetrain is a 2.5L V6 petrol engine (184bhp), based on the Rover KV6 engine and designated NV6, and the gearbox is a brand new five speed automatic.

The company claims that 85% of the car is improved. The standard 1.8T version Roewe 750 was priced at 180,000 yuan (US$29,000 or £14,500) in January 2008.

The 750's three trim levels were 750D, 750E, and 750i. The 750D can include either engine and 16" wheels, while the 750E and 750i are V6 only and 18" wheels. The upper end 750i added GPS and television/DVD as standard features. Prices range from 181,800 Yuan for a L4 to 268,800 Yuan for a loaded 750i.

The Roewe 750 was exported to various foreign markets under the MG marque, such as Peru, Chile, Algeria and Egypt.

References

External links

 Roewe Website 
 Roewe 750 on Aronline.co.uk

Executive cars
Mid-size cars
750
Cars introduced in 2006
2010s cars
Cars of China